Baruch Dego (or Barukh, ; born 28 March 1982) is an Ethiopian-born Israeli former association footballer, who played for the Israel national team.

Early life
Dego was born in Addis Ababa, Ethiopia, to an Ethiopian-Jewish family. He immigrated to Israel in the 1990's, with his parents and younger brothers. His younger brother Messay Dego is also a former association footballer, who played for the Israel U21 national team, and is currently the manager of Hapoel Kfar Saba.

Sports career
Dego initially played for Maccabi Ironi Ashdod In 2000-2001 he was transferred to Maccabi Tel Aviv, winning the championship and three national trophies. In 2004/05, he was the only player to score for Maccabi in the UEFA Champions League group stage. He scored two goals against Ajax Amsterdam in the local win 2–1, one goal from penalty against Juventus (1–1) and another penalty goal at Bayern Munich (5–1 to Bayern).

After spending 3 seasons with Hapoel Tel Aviv winning two more Israeli State Cup he moved to Maccabi Natanya which was coached by Lothar Matthäus He played one official match before being released and signing a two-year contract with  F.C. Ashdod. He reunited with his former coach Nir Klinger at Nea Salamis Famagusta FC.

On 28 May Apollon Limassol announced that Dego signed a two-year contract with the club. Dego reunited with his former Maccabi Tel Aviv attack partner Aldo Adorno with whom he played with during the 2003–2004 season.

On 6 July 2011, he joined Ironi Ramat HaSharon.  He was released in the middle of the 2012–13 season, and signed a contract to play for Hapoel Rishon LeZion of Israel's second league until the end of the season, with the hope of helping them to move up a league to Israel's top league for the next season.

Honours

Club
Maccabi Tel-Aviv
Israeli Premier League (1): 2002–03
Israel State Cup (2): 2001, 2002

Hapoel Tel-aviv
Israel State Cup (3): 2005, 2006, 2007

Individual
Footballer of the Year in Israel (1): 2003

References

External links

1982 births
Living people
Ethiopian Jews
Ethiopian emigrants to Israel
Citizens of Israel through Law of Return
Jewish Israeli sportspeople
Israeli footballers
Israel international footballers
Maccabi Ironi Ashdod F.C. players
F.C. Ashdod players
Maccabi Tel Aviv F.C. players
Hapoel Tel Aviv F.C. players
Maccabi Netanya F.C. players
Nea Salamis Famagusta FC players
Apollon Limassol FC players
Hapoel Nir Ramat HaSharon F.C. players
Hapoel Rishon LeZion F.C. players
Hapoel Ashkelon F.C. players
Israeli expatriate footballers
Expatriate footballers in Cyprus
Israeli expatriate sportspeople in Cyprus
Liga Leumit players
Israeli Premier League players
Cypriot First Division players
Footballers from Ashdod
Israel under-21 international footballers
Association football wingers
People from Addis Ababa
Israeli Footballer of the Year recipients